is a Japanese television drama that aired on NTV between 13 January and 17 March 2010.

Synopsis
Ogiwara Saki (Miho Kanno) is a woman who does not go with the flow of society but forges her own path. She hates flattering men and trying to be nice to people of the same sex. She has failed the bar exam nine times in a row but persists in her dream of being a lawyer while working as a clerk at a law firm. Saki's good friend, Hasumi Riko (Hiromi Nagasaku), who is a mother of two children, was high school classmates with Saki, but is in fact 35, because she had deliberately declared herself to be two years younger. She has no qualms of lying for the sake of female happiness, pretending to be married to a man of wealth and blessed with children. Because her personality is the exact opposite, this accentuates Saki's uncompromising way of life.

Cast

Miho Kanno as Ogiwara Saki
Himeka Asami as young Saki
Hiromi Nagasaku as Hasumi Riko
Shosuke Tanihara as Aida Kouki
Takashi Tsukamoto as Sakamoto Masato
Tomohiro Ichikawa as Imada Kenji
Anna Nose as Yokoya Satomi
Tokuma Nishioka as Chief Mashino
Mayumi Asaka as Ogiwara Hikari
Makiya Yamaguchi as Osabe Yoshitaka
Yukiko Takabayashi
Yasufumi Hayashi as Ogiwara Yoshinori
Ayumi Oka
Sei Hiraizumi as Nakashima Tsuyoshi

Episodes

References

External links
Official website
Japanese drama television series
2010 Japanese television series debuts
2010 Japanese television series endings
Television shows written by Kazuhiko Yukawa
Nippon TV dramas